Sarmaya Punjabi film is a 1990 Pakistani action film. Directed by Idrees Khan, written and produced by Mazhar Hussian, Nasir Adeeb. The film starring Sultan Rahi, Javed Sheikh, Neeli, Humayun Qureshi. Film Editor Mohammad Ashiq Ali

Film's box-office business
This film was shown at Mehfil cinema, Lahore and other cinemas for a combined total of 334 weeks in its first run. This film celebrated Solo Golden Jubilee in cities of Rawalpindi and Multan and silver jubilees in Gujranwala, Sialkot, and Faisalabad. This film celebrated Diamond Jubilee in Karachi and Golden Jubilee in Lahore at its second run. This film also celebrated Silver Jubilees in Lahore and Hyderabad at its third run.

Cast

 Sultan Rahi  as Zulfi Pelwan
 Anjuman Sehiylaa
 Javed Sheikh as Sp
 Shakeela as Javed's lover
 Sonia as Zebuo
 Waseem Abbas as Monna
 Albela
 Tanzeem Hassan  as Ibrahim
 Babar  as Dolur
 Mehmood Aslam  as Out
 Rashid Mehmood as Sonna
 Bahar as Haleema
 Nida Mumtaz as Sastaa
 Deeba as mother of Sastta
 Rangeela
 Mansoor Baloch as Sudhan
 Humayun Qureshi as Gurdev
 Asif Khan
 Adeeb  Thaikaydar

Track list

Film's music soundtrack was composed by the musician Chikku Lehri, with film song lyrics by Khawaja Pervez and Waris Ludhianvi and sung by Noor Jehan.

References

External links

 Sultan Rahi film history, Retrieved 11 October 2016

Pakistani action films
1990s political films
Pakistani crime films
1990 films
Punjabi-language Pakistani films
1990s crime films
1990s Punjabi-language films